Halfway is a city in Baker County, Oregon,  United States. The city took its name from the location of its post office, on the Alexander Stalker ranch, halfway between Pine and Jim Town. The population was 288 at the 2010 census.

During the dot-com bubble, Halfway agreed to rename itself Half.com for a year as a publicity stunt for the e-commerce company of the same name.

History
The community was named for the fact it is roughly halfway between Pine and Cornucopia. While a post office was established in 1887, the town was platted in another location in 1907, the post office moved there in 1908, and it incorporated in 1909.

Half.com name change
Halfway earned a place in the history of the dot-com era in December 1999, when it received and accepted an offer to rename itself as Half.com, after the e-commerce start-up, for one year in exchange for $110,000; 20 computers for the school; and other financial subsidies. It became the first city in the world to rename itself as a dot com. Among the less obvious reasons the town was chosen were its small population size (and thus its likelihood to accept such an offer) and the city's location, which fit perfectly into Half.com's marketing scheme. "They're within four miles of the 45th parallel which makes it halfway between the equator and the North Pole". The proclamation did not legally change its name. The city created and posted two signs at its borders that greeted visitors with "America's First Dot-com City". The city auctioned one of these off in September 2007 for $1000; the winner was Half.com's founder Josh Kopelman.

Half.com was bought by eBay in February 2001.

The original financial hardships that led to the city accepting Half.com's offer returned in 2004 when a company owning a promissory note, secured by its fairgrounds and improvements, demanded payment of over $530,000.

Geography
The city's geographic coordinates of 44°52′42″N 117°6′38″W (making it close to the midpoint between the equator and the North Pole) were part of the reason for Half.com to choose the town for its advertising gimmick.

Climate
According to the Köppen climate classification system, Halfway has a dry-summer humid continental climate (Köppen Dsb).

Demographics

2010 census
As of the census of 2010, there were 288 people, 153 households, and 76 families residing in the city. The racial makeup of the city was 94.1% White, 1.7% Native American, 0.7% Asian, 0.3% Pacific Islander, 1.4% from other races, and 1.7% from two or more races. Hispanic or Latino of any race were 3.5% of the population.

There were 153 households, of which 19.0% had children under the age of 18 living with them, 38.6% were married couples living together, 10.5% had a female householder with no husband present, 0.7% had a male householder with no wife present, and 50.3% were non-families. 46.4% of all households were made up of individuals, and 19% had someone living alone who was 65 years of age or older. The average household size was 1.88 and the average family size was 2.63.

The median age in the city was 52.7 years. 17.7% of residents were under the age of 18; 6.2% were between the ages of 18 and 24; 11.7% were from 25 to 44; 41% were from 45 to 64; and 23.3% were 65 years of age or older. The gender makeup of the city was 46.9% male and 53.1% female.

2000 census
As of the census of 2000, there were 337 people, 159 households, and 86 families residing in the city. The population density was 789.5 people per square mile (302.6/km2). There were 196 housing units at an average density of 459.1 per square mile (176.0/km2). The racial makeup of the city was 95.25% White, 2.97% Native American, 0.30% from other races, and 1.48% from two or more races. Hispanic or Latino of any race were 2.08% of the population.

There were 159 households, out of which 24.5% had children under the age of 18 living with them, 43.4% were married couples living together, 9.4% had a female householder with no husband present, and 45.3% were non-families. 39.6% of all households were made up of individuals, and 24.5% had someone living alone who was 65 years of age or older. The average household size was 2.12 and the average family size was 2.91.

In the city, the population was spread out, with 25.2% under the age of 18, 4.5% from 18 to 24, 20.5% from 25 to 44, 26.1% from 45 to 64, and 23.7% who were 65 years of age or older. The median age was 45 years. For every 100 females, there were 86.2 males. For every 100 females age 18 and over, there were 81.3 males.

The median income for a household in the city was $17,212, and the median income for a family was $27,813. Males had a median income of $23,750 versus $13,194 for females. The per capita income for the city was $12,997. About 24.5% of families and 28.3% of the population were below the poverty line, including 40.2% of those under age 18 and 29.5% of those age 65 or over.

Economy
In 2017, the three largest employers in Halfway were the Pine Eagle School District, the Idaho Power Company, and the U.S. Forest Service, which combined to employ over 125 people.

Notable people

Babette Beatty, the first Sports Illustrated Swimsuit Issue cover model
Barnaby Keeney, former president of Brown University
Robert S. Summers, professor at Cornell Law School

References

Further reading

External links

 Entry for Halfway in the Oregon Blue Book
 Halfway information from Hells Canyon Chamber of Commerce
 Archive of the Hells Canyon Journal, Halfway's local newspaper

Cities in Baker County, Oregon
Cities in Oregon
Populated places established in 1909
1909 establishments in Oregon
EBay